Consuelo Frank Galza (25 April 1912 – 31 March 1991), sometimes credited as Consuelito Frank, was a Mexican actress who played leading roles in the 1930s and 1940s and supporting roles from the early 1950s to the 1980s.

Career
Born in Arteaga, Michoacán, she made her acting debut in the stage as part of Chato Ortín's theatrical company. Her film debut came in Tierra, amor y dolor (1935), co-starring Domingo Soler. Her refined beauty and regal bearing caused her to be typecast as noblewomen and queens, such as Elisabeth Farnese in Rosa de Francia (1935), Anne of Austria in Los tres mosqueteros (1942), and the Viceroy's wife in Macario (1960). She died in 1991, at the age of 78.

Filmography

 Dreams of Love (1935)
 La familia Dressel (1935)
 ¡Ora Ponciano! (1937)
 El indio (1939)
 The Count of Monte Cristo (1942)
 Los tres mosqueteros (1942)
 The Martyr of Calvary (1952)
 Las Tres perfectas casadas (1953)
 La nave de los monstruos (1960)
 Macario (1960)
 Two Cheap Husbands (1960)
 Corazón salvaje (1968)

Partial television work
 Corazón salvaje (1977 TV series)

References

External links

1912 births
1991 deaths
Mexican film actresses
Mexican stage actresses
Mexican telenovela actresses
Golden Age of Mexican cinema
Actresses from Michoacán
20th-century Mexican actresses